Park Dong-kwang (born 14 April 1996) is a Korean handball player for Hanam Sports Council and the Korean national team.

He represented Korea at the 2019 World Men's Handball Championship.

References

1996 births
Living people
Korean male handball players